Mustalevria or must jelly (also mustpie and mustcake) is a traditional Greek kind of pudding made of grape must mixed with flour and boiled until thick. Moustokouloura, must biscuits or must cookies is the biscuit (cookies) version of it.

Historical information and names
Moustalevria originated in ancient Greece where it was known under the name oinouta. 

During the Byzantine era it was called mustopita or pastellos. Nowadays except from its standard name, moustalevria has alternative names that differ from place to place. E.g., it is also known as kefteria in Crete, kourkouta in Samos, palouzes in Cyprus and mustopita in other regions.

Preparation

In order to produce mustalevria, grape must (the juice from pressed grapes before fermentation) is boiled in low fire. Then a small amount of argil is added in order to clean the must. After the boil, ingredients like flour, sugar, semolina, petimezi, sesame, vanilla, almonds, walnuts, etc. are included. Mustalevria is popular at grape harvest season when the must is fresh.

See also
 Ancient Greek cuisine
 List of grape dishes
 Pelamushi

References

Bibliography
 Γ. Μπαμπινιώτης (Babiniotis), Λεξικό της Νέας Ελληνικής Γλώσσας, Athens, 2005.

Greek desserts
Confectionery
Grape dishes
Cypriot cuisine
Ancient Greek cuisine
Byzantine cuisine
Greek pastries